Alessandro Izekor (born 5 March 2000 in Brescia) is an Italian rugby union player.
His usual position is as a Flanker and he currently plays for Benetton in United Rugby Championship.

In February 2022 he was named as Permit Player for Benetton Rugby for 2021–22 United Rugby Championship season. He made his debut for Benetton in Round 12 of the 2021–22 United Rugby Championship against .

In 2020, Izekor was named in the Italy Under 20 squad. On the 14 October 2021, he was selected by Alessandro Troncon to be part of an Italy A 28-man squad and on 8 December he was named in Emerging Italy 27-man squad for the 2021 end-of-year rugby union internationals.

References 

It's Rugby England Profile
All Rugby Profile

2000 births
Living people
Italian rugby union players
Rugby union locks
Rugby Calvisano players
Benetton Rugby players
Rugby union flankers